Martin Larsson (born March 27, 1979) is a Swedish cross-country skier who competed between 1999 and 2011. He won a bronze medal in the 4 × 10 km relay at the 2007 FIS Nordic World Ski Championships in Sapporo and finished 79th in the 15 km event at those same championships.

Larsson has a total of five victories at various levels at distances up to 15 km since 2002.

Cross-country skiing results
All results are sourced from the International Ski Federation (FIS).

World Championships
 1 medal – (1 bronze)

World Cup

Season standings

Team podiums

 1 podium (1 )

References

External links

1979 births
Living people
Swedish male cross-country skiers
FIS Nordic World Ski Championships medalists in cross-country skiing